Sir Michael Scott Weir,  (28 January 1925 – 22 June 2006) was a British diplomat. He was born in Dunfermline, Fife, where his father was a primary school teacher.

Career
Weir went on a state scholarship to study oriental languages at the School of Oriental and African Studies in 1942. A year later he joined the Royal Air Force, which sent him to London University to learn Persian. He was then posted as an intelligence officer, including to Burma and Iraq. 

After demobilisation in 1947, he went to Balliol College, Oxford. He joined the Foreign Service in 1950, and quickly became one of its leading Arabists. His early postings included Bahrain, Doha and Sharjah. Weir's career culminated with his appointment as the United Kingdom's ambassador to Egypt (1979–1985). In 1981, he was sitting behind Egyptian President Anwar Sadat when the president was assassinated at a military parade.

Weir retired from the Foreign Service in 1985. He served as president of the Egypt Exploration Society (1988–2006) and Director of the 21st Century Trust (1990–2000). He was the founding Chairman of the British Egyptian Society in 1990 and continued as Chairman until 2006. The society has been sponsoring the Sir Michael Weir Annual Lecture in his honour.

Family
Weir met his first wife, Alison Walker, at Oxford. They were married from 1953 until 1974 and had four children, including writer and comedian Arabella Weir. In 1976, Weir married Hilary Reid, with whom he had two children. He died in London on 22 June 2006.

Honours
He was appointed CMG in 1974 and KCMG in 1980.

References
General

Specific

1925 births
2006 deaths
People educated at Dunfermline High School
Alumni of Balliol College, Oxford
Alumni of SOAS University of London
Alumni of the University of London
Scottish Arabists
Ambassadors of the United Kingdom to Egypt
Knights Commander of the Order of St Michael and St George
People from Dunfermline
Royal Air Force personnel of World War II
Royal Air Force officers
British expatriates in Myanmar
British expatriates in Iraq
British expatriates in Qatar
British expatriates in Bahrain
British expatriates in the United Arab Emirates